In mathematics, the Hodge bundle, named after W. V. D. Hodge, appears in the study of families of curves, where it provides an invariant in the moduli theory of algebraic curves. Furthermore, it has applications to the theory of modular forms on reductive algebraic groups and string theory.

Definition
Let  be the moduli space of algebraic curves of genus g curves over some scheme. The Hodge bundle is the pushforward of this sheaf, i.e.,
.

See also
ELSV formula

Notes

References

Moduli theory
Invariant theory
Algebraic curves